The 1998 Kentucky Derby was the 124th running of the Kentucky Derby. The race took place on May 2, 1998, and there were 143,215 people in attendance.

Payout
The 124th Kentucky Derby Payout Schedule

 $2 Exacta: (2-12)  Paid   $291.80
 $2 Trifecta: (2-12-7)  Paid   $1,221.00
 $1 Superfecta: (2-12-7-3)  Paid   $3,007.40

Full results

References

1998
Kentucky Derby
Derby
Kentucky
Kentucky Derby